Chilo is a genus of moths of the family Crambidae. Some of these moths are called borers.

Description
The proboscis is absent. Palpi porrect (extended forward), clothes with rough hair, and extending from two and a half to three lengths of the head. Maxillary palp dilated with scales at extremity. Frons with a conical projection. Antennae minutely serrate and ciliated. Tibia with outer spurs about two-thirds length of inner. Forewings with the apex rectangular in male, typically acute and produced in female. Vein 3 from before angle of cell and veins 4 and 5 well separated at origin. Vein 7 straight and well separated from veins 8 and 9. Vein 10 free, whereas vein 11 curved and approximated to vein 12. Hindwings with vein 3 from near angle of cell. Veins 4 and 5 from angle and veins 6 and 7 from upper angle.

Species
 Chilo agamemnon Błeszyński, 1962
 Chilo aleniella (Strand, 1913)
 Chilo argyrogramma Hampson, 1919
 Chilo argyropasta (Hampson, 1919)
 Chilo auricilius Dudgeon, 1905
 Chilo bandra (Kapur, 1950)
 Chilo batri (T. B. Fletcher, 1928)
 Chilo ceylonica Hampson, 1896
 Chilo chiriquitensis (Zeller, 1877)
 Chilo christophi Błeszyński, 1965
 Chilo cinnamomellus Berg, 1875
 Chilo costifusalis (Hampson, 1919)
 Chilo crypsimetalla (Turner, 1911)
 Chilo dailingensis Wang & Sung, 1981
 Chilo demotellus Walker, 1866
 Chilo diffusilinea (de Joannis, 1927)
 Chilo erianthalis Capps, 1963
 Chilo flavirufalis (Hampson, 1919)
 Chilo heracleus Zeller, 1877
 Chilo ikri (T. B. Fletcher, 1928)
 Chilo incerta (Sjöstedt, 1926)
 Chilo infuscatellus Snellen, 1890
 Chilo ingloriellus Möschler, 1882
 Chilo kanra (T. B. Fletcher, 1928)
 Chilo leucealis (Marion, 1957)
 Chilo ingulatellus Wang & Sung, 1981
 Chilo louisiadalis (Hampson, 1919)
 Chilo luniferalis Hampson, 1896
 Chilo luteellus (Motschulsky 1866)
 Chilo mercatorius Błeszyński, 1970
 Chilo mesoplagalis (Hampson, 1919)
 Chilo niponella (Thunberg, 1788)
 Chilo orichalcociliella (Strand, 1911)
 Chilo panici Wang & Sung, 1981
 Chilo partellus (Swinhoe, 1885)
 Chilo perfusalis (Hampson, 1919)
 Chilo phragmitella (Hübner, 1805)
 Chilo plejadellus Zincken, 1821
 Chilo polychrysus (Meyrick, 1932)
 Chilo prophylactes Meyrick, 1934
 Chilo psammathis (Hampson, 1919)
 Chilo pulverata (Wileman & South, 1917)
 Chilo pulverosellus Ragonot 1895
 Chilo quirimbellus Błeszyński, 1970
 Chilo recalvus (Wallengren, 1876)
 Chilo sacchariphagus (Bojer et al., 1856)
 Chilo spatiosellus Möschler, 1882
 Chilo subbivittalis (Gaede, 1917)
 Chilo suppressalis (Walker, 1860)
 Chilo tamsi Kapur, 1950
 Chilo terrenellus Pagenstecher, 1900
 Chilo thyrsis Błeszyński, 1963
 Chilo tumidicostalis (Hampson, 1919)
 Chilo vergilius Błeszyński, 1970
 Chilo yichunensis Wang & Sung, 1981
 Chilo zacconius Błeszyński, 1970
 Chilo zizaniae Wang & Sung, 1981
 Chilo zoriandellus Błeszyński, 1970

Status unclear
 Chilo decrepitellus Zincken, 1821 [nomen oblitum], described from Germany

Former species
 Chilo williami (de Joannis, 1927)

References

External links

Chilo at Fauna Europaea

Chiloini
Crambidae genera